Maria Anna Hjorth (born 15 October 1973) is a Swedish professional golfer.

Early years
Hjorth was born in Falun. As the youngest of three daughters to Kjell and Monica Hjorth, she first gripped a golf club at three years of age. Six years old, she traveled with her family, to compete in the unofficial Swedish Championship for children, the Colgate Cup, for girls up to 10 years of age. After the round, her older sister helped her to count the score.

Nordic skiing was a main interest during winter time. At ten years of age, Hjorth also began playing curling and later became the youngest ever individual winner of the Swedish Championship in curling.

On the golf course, she usually practiced with older boys, why she soon find it easier to play from the men's tees. During her amateur career she always represented Falun-Borlänge Golf Club.

Amateur career
Hjorth won many individual amateur titles including the 1995 European Ladies Amateur Championship at Wannsee, Berlin, Germany.

She represented Sweden twice at the Espirito Santo Trophy. In 1992 in Vancouver, Canada, with Annika Sörenstam on the team, Sweden finished fourth. In 1994 at Golf National in Paris, France, the Swedish team finished as bronze medalists. Hjorth was also part of the winning Swedish team at the 1994 European Lady Junior's Team Championship at Gutenhof Golf Club, Austria.

Hjorth attended the University of Stirling in Scotland.

Professional career
Hjorth turned professional in 1996 and won the Swedish Golf Tour Order of Merit that year. She played mainly on the Ladies European Tour (LET) in 1996 and 1997. In late 1997, she finished fourth at the LPGA Final Qualifying Tournament to gain exempt status on the U.S.-based LPGA Tour for the 1998 season. Since 1998 she has played mainly on LPGA Tour, while continuing to play in Europe several times each year. 

She has won two individual titles on the LET and five on the LPGA. Winning her second LPGA title in 1999, the Mizuno Classic in Japan, she played with a mix-matched set of clubs because her clubs were lost by an airline. 

She has finished second in the Women's PGA Championship, losing in a playoff, and tied second in the Women's British Open. She was also sole or tied second in the Evian Masters in France three times before it was recognized as a major championship. 

She was a member of five European Solheim Cup teams in 2002, 2005, 2007, 2009, and 2011 and played three times in the Praia d'El Rey European Cup, a team competition sanctioned by the LET.

Private life
In 1995, three weeks before winning the European Ladies Amateur Championship, she was diagnosed with diabetes.

She married Shaun McBride on New Years eve 2007 and since then played under her married name, Maria McBride. Their daughter Emily was born in 2009 and the family resides in Orlando, Florida.

Her husband has caddied for her, as well as on the PGA Tour, for Bryce Molder.

Amateur wins
1990 Norwegian Open Amateur Championship
1991 British Girls Open Championship, Swedish Youth under 19 Championship
1993 Swedish Match-play Championship, French Open Junior Championship
1994 Swedish Junior Match-play Championship, Swedish Match-play Championship
1995 European Ladies Amateur Championship, Spanish International Ladies Amateur Championship, Helen Holm Scottish Women's Open Championship

Professional wins (13)

LPGA Tour (5)

LPGA Tour playoff record (0–2)

Ladies European Tour (2)

Other wins (6)
1991 Aspeboda Ladies Open (Swedish Golf Tour) (as an amateur)
1993 Aspeboda Ladies Open (Swedish Golf Tour) (as an amateur)
1996 Delsjö Ladies Open, Toyota Ladies Open, Aspeboda Ladies Open (all Swedish Golf Tour)
1997 A.V. Rubbish Classic (Players West Tour)

Results in LPGA majors

^ The Women's British Open replaced the du Maurier Classic as an LPGA major in 2001
^^ The Evian Championship was added as a major in 2013

CUT = missed the half-way cut
"T" = tied for place

Summary

Most consecutive cuts made – 6 (twice)
Longest streak of top-10s – 1 (nine times)

LPGA Tour career summary

official through the 2022 season

Team appearances
Amateur
European Ladies' Team Championship (representing Sweden): 1993, 1995
European Lady Junior's Team Championship (representing Sweden): 1992, 1994 (winners)
Espirito Santo Trophy (representing Sweden): 1992, 1994

Professional
Praia d'El Rey European Cup (representing  Ladies European Tour): 1997, 1998 (tie), 1999 (winners)
Solheim Cup (representing Europe): 2002, 2005, 2007, 2009, 2011 (winners)
Lexus Cup (representing International team): 2007
World Cup (representing Sweden): 2008

Solheim Cup record

References

External links

Swedish female golfers
LPGA Tour golfers
Ladies European Tour golfers
Solheim Cup competitors for Europe
Swedish female curlers
People from Falun
Golfers from Orlando, Florida
1973 births
Living people
20th-century Swedish women
21st-century Swedish women